Lan Yingying (born 16 April 1990), also known as Lyric Lan, is a Chinese actress. She is known for her roles as Huanbi in Empresses in the Palace (2011).

Career
Lan made her movie debut playing the role of Haitang in Mural in 2011. She also filmed Empresses in the Palace in 2011, with other notable works like Who Sleeps My Bro in 2016 and Surgeons in 2017.

She made her English film debut with the work Pacific Rim Uprising in 2018.

Filmography

Film

Television series

Variety show

Discography

Awards and nominations

References

External links
 

1990 births
Living people
Actresses from Shanghai
21st-century Chinese actresses
Chinese film actresses
Chinese television actresses
Central Academy of Drama alumni